Bernard Taub Feld (December 21, 1919 – February 19, 1993) was a professor of physics at the Massachusetts Institute of Technology.  He helped develop the atomic bomb, and later led an international movement among scientists to banish nuclear weapons.
His life could be effectively summed up with the following famous quotation:

Early life
Feld was born in Brooklyn, New York.  He  graduated from the City College of New York with a bachelor of science degree in 1939. He began graduate school at Columbia University, but suspended his studies to join the American war effort. He spent the war serving as an assistant to Enrico Fermi and Leó Szilárd  working on the Manhattan Project.  After World War II, he returned to Columbia University to receive his PhD in 1945 with thesis advisor Willis Lamb.

Career
Feld was on the faculty of MIT from 1948 until he retired in 1990.  During this time, he was President of the Albert Einstein Peace Prize Foundation, editor of the Bulletin of the Atomic Scientists, and head of the American Pugwash Committee.

Feld was a Ford Foundation Fellow and a visiting scientist at the European Center for Nuclear Research (CERN) in Geneva, Switzerland.

The Pugwash Conferences on Science and World Affairs won the Nobel Peace Prize in 1995.  Feld was a leader in these conferences, serving as U.S. Chairman from 1963 to 1973 and as International Chairman from 1973 to 1978.  It was in this role that he attracted the anger of Richard Nixon's White House.  He was eleventh on Nixon's list of enemies, a fact that pleased him tremendously.

"One month after the election of Ronald Reagan, Feld being an editor of 'Bulletin of the American Atomic Scientists' reported that his publication had decided to move the hands on the Doomsday Clock featured on its cover from seven to four minutes to midnight, because, as 'the year drew to a close, the world seemed to be moving unevenly but inexorably closer to nuclear disaster' ".

Selected publications

Articles

Books

References

External links
 Obituary from MIT News Office

1919 births
1993 deaths
People from Brooklyn
American nuclear physicists
Manhattan Project people
American anti–nuclear weapons activists
Pugwash Conferences on Science and World Affairs
Fellows of the American Association for the Advancement of Science
Fellows of the American Physical Society
Nixon's Enemies List
Activists from New York (state)
Scientists from New York (state)
People associated with CERN
City College of New York alumni
Columbia University alumni